Mysus (Ancient Greek: Μυσός) was the brother of Car and Lydus in Greek mythology according to Herodotus.

Note

References 

 Herodotus, The Histories with an English translation by A. D. Godley. Cambridge. Harvard University Press. 1920. . Online version at the Topos Text Project. Greek text available at Perseus Digital Library.

Characters in Greek mythology
Mysia